The Providence Bruins Radio Network was the radio network of the Providence Bruins, a minor league affiliate of the Boston Bruins, which operated from 1992–2014. As of the 2014–15 season, the Providence Bruins games' audio can be heard online only.

Station listing

Flagship station (0 stations)

Current affiliates (0 stations)

Rhode Island (0 stations)

Unsure status (0 stations)

Former stations of the network (10 stations)

Former flagships (3 stations)
630/WPRO: Providence, Rhode Island (1992-1999)
550/WDDZ (now WSJW): Pawtucket, Rhode Island (1999-2005; known as WLKW until 2000, WICE 2000-2001 & WDDZ through 2005)
1320/WARL (now WARA): Attleboro, Massachusetts (2005-2006)

Former affiliates (7 stations)
1230/WBLQ: Westerly
1340/WNBH: New Bedford, Massachusetts (to 2008)
1380/WNRI: Woonsocket
1450/WLKW: West Warwick, Rhode Island (to 2008)
88.1/WBLQ (now WKIV): Westerly, Rhode Island (2005-2006)
88.3/WQRI: Bristol, Rhode Island (2005-2006)
96.7/WBLQ-LP (now WSUB-LP): Ashaway, Rhode Island (2006-2009)

External links
North East Radio Watch: October 18, 2010 with list of networks & stations of the A.H.L..

Radio Network
Sports radio networks in the United States